Foes is a 1980 tabletop role-playing game supplement for RuneQuest published by Chaosium. A 16 page version of Foes called Fangs was published by Chaosium in 1980, it was republished in 2016 in PDF format as part of Chaosium's RuneQuest: Classic Edition Kickstarter.

Contents
Foes is a monster book for RuneQuest. Foes contains the statistical profiles of over 1200 computer generated creatures including: Aldryami, Dragonewts, beast men, trolls, flying creatures, lycanthropes, undead, humanoids, and nomads w/mounts.

Reception
Steve Jackson reviewed Foes in The Space Gamer No. 28. Jackson commented that "you will probably want it. Just don't let it become a crutch. A book like this should supplement your imagination, not replace it."

References

External links
 

Role-playing game supplements introduced in 1980
RuneQuest 2nd edition supplements